Beñat is a Basque masculine given name variant of Bernard, which comes from Germanic origin. There are variants in other languages including the Spanish and Italian Bernardo. While the Basque language does not have a feminine given name equivalent, other languages do, such as the French Bernardine. Beñat is uncommon as a surname. People with the name Beñat include:

 Beñat Achiary, Basque vocal improviser 
 Beñat Albizuri (born 1981), Basque road bicycle racer
 Beñat Etxebarria (born 1987), Basque football player
 Beñat Intxausti (born 1986) Basque road racing cyclist
 Beñat San José (born 1979), Basque football manager

References

Given names
Basque masculine given names